Isabella Maria dal Pozzo (died 1700) was an Italian painter.

Life and work

Isabella Maria dal Pozzo was born in Turin. She flourished as a painter starting in the 1660s. Starting in 1676, she began working in the court of Princess Henriette Adelaide of Savoy.

Notable collections
Roman Charity (after Guido Reni), 1660–1699, National Trust

References

1700 deaths
Italian women painters
Painters from Turin
Artists from Munich
17th-century Italian painters
17th-century Italian women artists